Romain Bacon (born 8 March 1990 in Le Blanc-Mesnil) is a French road cyclist, who currently rides for CC Nogent-sur-Oise.

Major results
2007
 2nd Chrono des Nations Juniors
2008
 1st  Time trial, National Junior Road Championships
 1st Chrono des Nations Juniors
 5th Time trial, European Junior Road Championships
 9th Paris–Roubaix Juniors
2010
 2nd Chrono des Nations
2012
 3rd Paris–Troyes
2018
 4th Grand Prix des Marbriers
2019
 2nd Flèche Ardennaise

References

1990 births
Living people
French male cyclists
People from Le Blanc-Mesnil
21st-century French people